Karen Tei Yamashita (born January 8, 1951) is a Japanese American writer.

Early life 
Yamashita was born on January 8, 1951, in Oakland, California.

Career 
Yamashita is Professor of Literature at the University of California, Santa Cruz, where she teaches creative writing and Asian American literature. Her works, several of which contain elements of magic realism, include novels  I Hotel (2010), Circle K Cycles (2001), Tropic of Orange (1997), Brazil-Maru (1992), and Through the Arc of the Rain Forest (1990).  Yamashita's novels emphasize the necessity of polyglot, multicultural communities in an increasingly globalized age, even as they destabilize orthodox notions of borders and national/ethnic identity.

She has also written a number of plays, including Hannah Kusoh, Noh Bozos and O-Men which was produced by the Asian American theatre group, East West Players.

Awards 
In 2009, Yamashita received the Chancellor’s Award for Diversity from the University of California, Santa Cruz. She was a finalist for the 2010 National Book Award. In 2011 she was named a Fellow of United States Artists. In 2013 she was co-appointed with Bettina Aptheker as the UC Presidential Chair in Feminist Critical Race and Ethnic Studies; a position offered to distinguished members of the university's faculty intended to encourage new or interdisciplinary program development.

Yamashita was named the recipient of the National Book Foundation Medal for Distinguished Contribution to American Letters in 2021.

Selected writings 

 Through the Arc of the Rain Forest. (Coffee House Press, 1990).
 Brazil-Maru. (Coffee House Press, 1992).
 Tropic of Orange. (Coffee House Press, 1997).
 Circle K Cycles. (Coffee House Press, 2001).
 I Hotel. (Coffee House Press, 2010).
 Anime Wong: Fictions of Performance, edited with an afterword by Stephen Hong Sohn. (Coffee House Press, 2014).
 Letters to Memory. (Coffee House Press, 2017).
 Sansei and Sensibility: Stories. (Coffee House Press, 2020).

References

External links 
 
 
 
 Includes a list of critical work on the author and additional biographical details
 
 
Karen Tei Yamashita Papers. MS 465. Special Collections and Archives, University Library, University of California, Santa Cruz. Retrieved 23 April 2020.

American writers of Japanese descent
1951 births
Living people
American dramatists and playwrights of Japanese descent
Writers from Oakland, California
American women dramatists and playwrights
American novelists of Asian descent
American women writers of Asian descent
American women novelists
20th-century American novelists
20th-century American women writers
20th-century Japanese women writers
20th-century Japanese writers
Carleton College alumni
American Book Award winners
National Book Award winners
21st-century American women